Mahesh Babu is an Indian actor, producer, media personality, and philanthropist who works mainly in Telugu cinema. He has established as one of the popular celebrities in India and also one of the highest paid actors in India. Babu has appeared in more than 25 films, and won several accolades including eight Nandi Awards, five Filmfare South Awards, four SIIMA awards, three CineMAA Awards, and one IIFA Utsavam Award. He has featured in Forbes India's Celebrity 100 list since 2012.

Babu won his first award (Nandi Award for Best Male Debut) in 2000 for his performance in Raja Kumarudu, and has gone on to win the most Nandi Awards out of any individual. His performance in films such as  Okkadu, Dookudu and Srimanthudu fetched him further more awards including two CineMAA Awards, three Filmfare South Awards, two Nandi Awards and one Santosham Film Award. Babu has the second highest wins in the category Filmfare Award for Best Actor – Telugu, next to Chiranjeevi.

Awards and nominations

See also 

 Mahesh Babu filmography

Notes

References 

Babu, Mahesh